Antistia is a genus of mantises in the family Tarachodidae. There are at least four described species in Antistia.

Species
These four species belong to the genus Antistia:
 Antistia maculipennis Stal, 1876
 Antistia parva Beier, 1953
 Antistia robusta Kaltenbach, 1996
 Antistia vicina Kaltenbach, 1996

See also
List of mantis genera and species

References

Further reading

 
 

 
Tarachodidae
Mantodea genera
Taxa named by Carl Stål